"Cuore amaro" is a song by Italian singer Gaia. It was written by Gaia, Jacopo Ettorre, Machweo and Orang3 and produced by Machweo and Simon Says.

It was released by Sony Music on 4 March 2021. The song was Gaia's entry for the Sanremo Music Festival 2021, the 71st edition of Italy's musical festival which doubles also as a selection of the act for Eurovision Song Contest, where it placed 19th in the grand final. "Cuore amaro" peaked at number 17 on the Italian FIMI Singles Chart and was certified gold in Italy.

Background
The song deals with the singer's love for herself, as described by the artist herself: "For the first time I'm not singing about love, but a song about myself, about my story. The "bitter heart" is mine, it tells a little about my stubbornness in not giving up, in a sincere way. It is also a song that in terms of arrangement, mood and production tells my story and takes you a little bit to South America but in a fresh way, in today's way... in my way of making music".

Music video
The music video for the song was released on YouTube on 4 March 2021, to accompany the single's release. It was directed by Enea Colombi.

Live performances
On 1 May 2021 Gaia performed the song during the annual Concerto del Primo Maggio.

Track listing

Charts

Certifications

References

2021 singles
2021 songs
Gaia Gozzi songs
Sanremo Music Festival songs